Kristian Bećiri (born 14 June 1994) is a Croatian handball player who plays for HBW Balingen-Weilstetten and the Croatian national team. He is of paternal Albanian and maternal Slovene descent.

He represented Croatia at the 2019 World Men's Handball Championship.

References

External links
 

1994 births
Living people
People from Bergstraße (district)
Sportspeople from Darmstadt (region)
Croatian male handball players
Croatian people of Albanian descent 
Croatian people of Slovenian descent